The Lamartina Building is a historic commercial building located at 700-704 West 3rd Street in Thibodaux, Louisiana.

Built before the Civil War, the two-story brick commercial building features gable parapets and a  wooden front gallery. The facade was stuccoed in 1922, and the structure has not been altered since then.

The building was listed on the National Register of Historic Places on March 5, 1986.

It is one of 14 individually NRHP-listed properties in the "Thibodaux Multiple Resource Area", which also includes:
Bank of Lafourche Building
Breaux House
Building at 108 Green Street
Chanticleer Gift Shop
Citizens Bank of Lafourche
Grand Theatre

McCulla House
Peltier House
Percy-Lobdell Building
Riviere Building
Riviere House
Robichaux House
St. Joseph Co-Cathedral and Rectory

See also
 National Register of Historic Places listings in Lafourche Parish, Louisiana

References

Commercial buildings on the National Register of Historic Places in Louisiana
Commercial buildings completed in 1862
Lafourche Parish, Louisiana
National Register of Historic Places in Lafourche Parish, Louisiana